The 2004–05 Liga Bet season saw Maccabi Sektzia Ma'alot (champions of the North A division), Hapoel Bnei Tamra (champions of the North B division), Maccabi Ironi Bat Yam (champions of the South A division) and Hapoel Arad (champions of the South B division) win their regional divisions and promoted to Liga Alef.

The runners-up in each division entered a promotion/relegation play-offs with the clubs ranked 12th in Liga Alef. In the north section, Hapoel Umm al-Fahm (from North B division) won the play-offs and was promoted. In the south section, Ironi Nes Tziona (from South B division) won the play-offs and was promoted.

At the bottom, Beitar Acre (from North A division) and Maccabi Bnei Tira (from South A division) were relegated to Liga Gimel, whilst Maccabi Majd al-Krum (from North A division) and Beitar Kiryat Ono (from South A division) folded during the season. However, Maccabi Daliyat al-Karmel, Hapoel Kafr Misr/Nein (from North B division) (from North B division), Moadon Tzeirei Rahat and Maccabi Yehud (from South B division), which finished in the relegation zone, were all reprieved from relegation, after several vacancies were created in Liga Bet for the 2005–06 season, mostly due to withdrawals of clubs.

North A Division

During the season, Maccabi Majd al-Krum (after 11 matches) folded and its results were annulled.

North B Division

South A Division

During the season, Beitar Kiryat Ono (after 13 matches) folded and its results were annulled.

South B Division

Promotion play-offs

North play-off
Liga Bet North A and North B runners-up, Hapoel Karmiel and Hapoel Umm al-Fahm faced the 12th placed club in Liga Alef North, Maccabi Shefa-'Amr. The teams played each other in a round-robin tournament, with all matches held at a neutral venue, Nahariya Municipal Stadium.

Hapoel Umm al-Fahm won the play-offs and was promoted to Liga Alef. Maccabi Shefa-'Amr remained in Liga Alef after Hapoel Majd al-Krum (which relegated from Liga Artzit to Liga Alef) folded during the summer.

South play-off
Liga Bet South A and Liga Bet South B runners-up, Hapoel Azor and Ironi Nes Tziona faced the 12th placed club in Liga Alef South, Beitar Giv'at Ze'ev. The teams played each other in a round-robin tournament, with all matches held at a neutral venue, Bat Yam Municipal Stadium.

Ironi Nes Tziona won the play-offs and was promoted to Liga Alef. Beitar Giv'at Ze'ev remained in Liga Alef after a vacancy was created in the South division, following the merger of Liga Artzit club, Maccabi Ramat Amidar, with Hakoah Ramat Gan.

References
Liga Bet North, 04-05  One 
Liga Bet North B, 04-05  One 
Liga Bet South A, 04-05 One 
Liga Bet South B, 04-05 One 

Liga Bet seasons
5
Israel